Robert Zimmer (born 25 October 1953 in Trier, West Germany) is a German philosopher and essayist who writes biographies and popular introductions to philosophy and to the history of philosophy.

Life

Robert Zimmer was educated at the German universities of Saarbrücken and Düsseldorf and wrote his doctoral dissertation on Edmund Burke. From 1986 - 2013 he lived as a freelance writer and publicist in Berlin. In 2013 he moved to Stuttgart. His most popular book so far has been “Das Philosophenportal”, a collection of 16 essays on 16 different classical works of philosophy, which has been translated into more than a dozen languages (not yet in English). In 2010 he published a biography of Arthur Schopenhauer. He also translated a selection of essays by the 19th Century French critic and writer Charles Augustin Sainte-Beuve.

Zimmer is a follower of critical rationalism. Together with Martin Morgenstern he wrote a short and popular biography of Karl Popper and edited the correspondence between Popper and Hans Albert.

Selected works
 2011 (with M. Morgenstern) Gespräche mit Hans Albert
 2010 Arthur Schopenhauer. Ein philosophischer Weltbürger
 2009 Basis-Bibliothek Philosophie
 2009 Das große Philosophenportal
 2005 (ed., with M. Morgenstern) Hans Albert / Karl Popper: Briefwechsel
 2004 Das Philosophenportal
 2002 (with Martin Morgenstern) Karl Popper
 1995 Edmund Burke zur Einführung

External links 
 Official website

1953 births
20th-century essayists
20th-century German non-fiction writers
20th-century German philosophers
21st-century essayists
21st-century German non-fiction writers
21st-century German philosophers
Critical rationalists
German male essayists
German male non-fiction writers
German male writers
Historians of philosophy
Living people
Philosophy writers
Rationalists